Jane Hinton (1919–2003) was a pioneer in the study of bacterial antibiotic resistance and one of the first two African-American women to gain the degree of Doctor of Veterinary Medicine (1949). Prior to her veterinary medicine studies at the University of Pennsylvania, she had been a laboratory technician at Harvar, co-developing the Mueller–Hinton agar, a culture medium that is now commonly used to test bacterial susceptibility to antibiotics. She later practiced as a small animal veterinarian in Massachusetts, and then as a federal government inspector. Hinton was the daughter of William Augustus Hinton, a microbiologist and the first African-American professor at Harvard University.

Early life and education

Jane Hinton was born on May 1, 1919. Her father, William Augustus Hinton (1883–1959), was a bacteriologist and pathologist who was an expert in the diagnosis and treatment of syphilis, including the development of tests for syphilis. The son of former slaves, he was the first African-American professor at Harvard University and the first African-American author of a textbook. He entered laboratory medicine because racism in Boston prevented him from gaining an internship in medicine. Jane Hinton's mother was Ada  (b. 1878), a high school teacher and social worker, born in Georgia. William and Ada married in 1909, and had two daughters, Jane and Ann Hinton Jones. Jane Hinton earned her undergraduate degree at the age of 20 from Simmons College in 1939.

Career

In 1931, Hinton's father developed a Medical Laboratory Techniques course, which was open to women, although that profession was then generally not open to women. Jane Hinton worked in Harvard's laboratories at the time she co-developed the Mueller–Hinton agar with John Howard Mueller. This agar was a medium developed to isolate the Neisseria bacteria that caused gonorrhea and meningogoccal meningitis. Mueller and Hinton discovered that starch within the agar helped aid bacterial growth and prevented bacteria toxins from interfering with antibiotic testing. It became the most widely used culture medium for Neisseria. In the 1960s, tests indicated its suitability for detecting whether bacteria are susceptible to antibiotics. The Clinical and Laboratory Standards Institute, which establishes the best international laboratory standards, adopted the Kirby–Bauer technique using Mueller–Hinton agar as the gold standard for antibiotic testing.

During World War II, Hinton also worked as a lab technician in Arizona. After the War, Hinton studied veterinary medicine at the University of Pennsylvania, gaining her Doctor of Veterinary Medicine (VMD) degree in 1949. She and Alfreda Johnson Webb, who graduated with a VMD from the Tuskegee Institute (now Tuskegee University) that year, were the first African-American women veterinarians. There had been only four African-American VMD graduates at the University of Pennsylvania before Hinton gained her degree, and there would not be another until 1968. Hinton and Webb were also the first African-American members of the Women's Veterinary Medicine Association.
 
After gaining her degree, Hinton practiced as a small animal veterinarian in Canton, Massachusetts, and then a federal government inspector in Framingham, Massachusetts.

Jane Hinton, together with John Taylor, the first African-American graduate of the University of Pennsylvania veterinary medicine school, were honored during the school's centennial celebrations by the Minority Veterinary Students association in 1984.

Jane Hinton died on April 9, 2003.

References

1919 births
2003 deaths
African-American scientists
African-American women academics
American women academics
African-American academics
University of Pennsylvania School of Veterinary Medicine alumni
American veterinarians
20th-century African-American women
20th-century African-American people
20th-century American people
21st-century African-American people
21st-century African-American women
Harvard University staff